The Finley Site is an archeological site in Sweetwater County, Wyoming. The site was investigated beginning in 1940 when projectile points were found on the surface by Orion B. Finley in the vicinity of a stable section of the Killpecker Dune Field. The site dates to the late Paleoindian Period of about 9000 years before present. The projectile points from the Finley Site established the Eden point type, and included Scottsbluff Type I and II points, linking the cultures to the Cody Cultural Complex.

The site was placed on the National Register of Historic Places on November 17, 2010.

References

External links
 Finley Site at the Wyoming State Historic Preservation Office

		
National Register of Historic Places in Sweetwater County, Wyoming
Archaeological sites on the National Register of Historic Places in Wyoming